Oleksandr Chornomorets (born 5 April 1993) is a Ukrainian professional football defender who plays for Kolos Kovalivka in the Ukrainian First League.

Career
Chornomorets is a product of the different Ukrainian youth sportive schools and then played in FC Morshyn in the Ukrainian Second League. In 2011, he signed a contract with FC Dynamo in the Ukrainian Premier League and from June 2012 he played in the Ukrainian First League.

Hounours
Kolos Kovalivka
 Ukrainian First League: 2018–19

References

External links
 
 

1993 births
Living people
People from Zelenodolsk
Ukrainian footballers
Association football defenders
Piddubny Olympic College alumni
FC Dynamo Kyiv players
FC Dynamo-2 Kyiv players
FC Skala Stryi (2004) players
FC Desna Chernihiv players
FC Volyn Lutsk players
FC Kolos Kovalivka players
Ukrainian Premier League players
Ukrainian First League players
Ukrainian Second League players
Ukraine youth international footballers
Sportspeople from Dnipropetrovsk Oblast